Harjinder Singh may refer to:

 Harjinder Singh (food scientist), Fellow of the Royal Society Te Apārangi
 Harjinder Singh (IAF Officer), Indian Air Vice Marshal
 Harjinder Singh Dilgeer, Indian philosopher
 Harjinder Singh (footballer), Indian footballer